Jurich Claasens (born 9 July 2001) is a South African rugby union player for the  in the Currie Cup. His regular position is scrum-half.

Claasens was named in the  side for the 2022 Currie Cup Premier Division.

References

South African rugby union players
Living people
Rugby union scrum-halves
Golden Lions players
2001 births